Camilla Adang is a Dutch associate professor of Islamic studies at Tel Aviv University in Tel Aviv, Israel.

Biography
Adang was born in Bussum, Netherlands in 1960. Adang completed her doctorate in Islamic studies at Radboud University Nijmegen in Nijmegen.

Career
Adang was a fellow at the Netherlands Institute for Advanced Study in Wassenaar from September 2009 to June 2010. While there, she published a number of works on the life of Medieval Andalusian theologian Ibn Hazm and his views. During this time, she also contributed to a book on inter-religious polemics and rational theology. Adang was also a fellow at The Woolf Institute in Cambridge as of 2011. During this time, she delivered a seminar on Muslim-Jewish polemics in Medieval Spain which was noted for Adang's definition of Muslim Fatwas are merely legal verdicts, rather than "death sentences" as popularly portrayed in the media, in addition to chairing a roundtable discussion of linguistic influences on Judeo-Muslim exchanges.

Adang has also written multiple encyclopedia articles and research papers on Muslim-Jewish polemics.

Citations

External links
Books by Camilla Adang at WorldCat.
Books by Camilla Adang at Library Thing.

Living people
Radboud University Nijmegen alumni
Dutch Islamic studies scholars
Year of birth missing (living people)
Women scholars of Islam